Mangelia brusinae is a species of sea snail, a marine gastropod mollusk in the family Mangeliidae.

Description
The length of the shell attains 4 mm.

Distribution
This species occurs in the Adriatic Sea off Croatia.

References

 Gofas, S.; Le Renard, J.; Bouchet, P. (2001). Mollusca, in: Costello, M.J. et al. (Ed.) (2001). European register of marine species: a check-list of the marine species in Europe and a bibliography of guides to their identification. Collection Patrimoines Naturels, 50: pp. 180–213

External links
  Tucker, J.K. 2004 Catalog of recent and fossil turrids (Mollusca: Gastropoda). Zootaxa 682:1–1295.
 
 MNHN, Paris: Mangelia brusinae

brusinae
Gastropods described in 1978